Capcom Fighting All-Stars: Code Holder was a 3D fighting game planned for the arcade and PlayStation 2 that was to be developed by Capcom.  Like KOF: Maximum Impact, it was designed to translate a 2D fighting game series into 3D. This was done previously in the Street Fighter EX series, which Capcom co-produced with Arika. The game utilized 3D assets that were previously created for a third Capcom vs. SNK title, which had been cancelled due to SNK's financial difficulties. Capcom beta-tested the game, but after negative feedback from players and more months in development, the game was canceled in August 2003.

The life system was 3-tiered: if the player lost one tier, a break moment would occur and then the fight would resume, much like the life system in Vampire Savior. However the life system was also linked to the power bar: for each tier lost, a character gained an additional level in the Super Combo gauge (at full life, a character only has single-level super combo moves). Super arts were handled in three tiers, each super costing one, two, or three levels to use them.

Many parts of the system were later used in Capcom Fighting Evolution for Ingrid's gameplay and Capcom later revisited the concept of 2D fighters in 3D with the more traditional Street Fighter IV and Tatsunoko vs. Capcom.

Characters

Returning characters
 Ryu (Street Fighter)
 Chun-Li (Street Fighter II)
 Akuma (Super Street Fighter II Turbo)
 Alex (Street Fighter III)
 Charlie (Street Fighter Alpha)
 Mike Haggar (Final Fight)
 Poison (Final Fight)
 Batsu (Rival Schools)
 Akira (Rival Schools)
 Strider Hiryu (Strider)
 Demitri Maximoff (Darkstalkers: The Night Warriors)

New characters
D.D. - "God of Thunder"
Rook - "Fallen Angel"
 Ingrid - "Eternal Goddess"
Avel - "Death"

Guest characters
Kyo Kusanagi (The King of Fighters) - Kyo's inclusion comes from the game's roots starting out as a sequel to Capcom vs SNK 2. After the game was reworked to a Capcom-only crossover, the then-reformed SNK Playmore gave Capcom permission to use one of their characters due in part to the involvement of ex-SNK staff assigned to this project (including Code Holder's director Toyohisa Tanabe)

Story
Death was running around Metro City with a bomb called Laughter Sun. Mike Haggar called all above mentioned fighters to beat Death and defuse the bomb. To disarm it, codes were needed to be input. D.D., Rook, and Ingrid were the Code Holders, they had the codes that would deactivate the bomb. D.D. was the leader, Ingrid & Rook were his teammates. Their codes were Ogre, Fallen Angel and Isis.

Legacy
While the game never received an official release, the idea of Capcom's own characters in a crossover game would instead be used in the 2D fighting game, Capcom Fighting Evolution; released in 2004.

An original character slated to debut in All-Stars, Ingrid, would later appear in Capcom Fighting Evolution/Jam for the PlayStation 2 and Arcades and in Project X Zone 2. Ingrid would also appear in Street Fighter Alpha 3 MAX for the PlayStation Portable. Ingrid, D.D. and Rook made a cameo appearance in the Rhythm RPG Otoranger.

Two unique ideas were used in the game. The first idea was a "break" during the matches. This was to present a logical representation for things happening between rounds. The second idea was the "finishing move," a concept derived to be similar to that of the "Fatality" in Mortal Kombat. Neither idea has seen use in any subsequent Capcom games.

In 2017, Capcom published a pair of articles about the game on their Street Fighter V website revealing previously unpublished artwork and details for the game, including the identities of its two hidden characters (Akuma and Dimitri), the final boss and its planned guest character (SNK Playmore's Kyo Kusanagi).

In Street Fighter V, Ingrid appears as an alternate costume for Karin.

References

External links 
 Capcom Fighting All-Stars page from the Fighters Frontline 

Capcom games
Cancelled arcade video games
Cancelled PlayStation 2 games
Crossover fighting games
Fighting games
Video games about bomb disposal

ja:イングリッド (カプコン)